Anterior thoracic nerves may refer to:
 Lateral pectoral nerve
 Medial pectoral nerve